Stranger Things is an American science fiction fantasy horror drama television series created by the Duffer Brothers that is streaming on Netflix. The brothers serve as showrunners and are executive producers along with Shawn Levy and Dan Cohen. The first season of the series was released on Netflix on July 15, 2016, with the second, third, and fourth seasons following in October 2017, July 2019, and May and July 2022, respectively.

 In February 2022, Netflix renewed the series for a fifth and final season.

Series overview

Episodes

Season 1 (2016)

Season 2 (2017)

Season 3 (2019)

Season 4 (2022)

Season 5 
The fifth and final season was announced by Netflix in February 2022, and writing began in August of the same year. According to the Duffers, the season will likely not introduce new characters and will focus on the established ones. The season will consist of eight episodes, with principal photography set to begin in May 2023.

References

External links

Lists of American supernatural television series episodes